The 1976 Taça de Portugal Final was the final match of the 1975–76 Taça de Portugal, the 36th season of the Taça de Portugal, the premier Portuguese football cup competition organized by the Portuguese Football Federation (FPF). The match was played on 13 June 1976 at the Estádio das Antas in Porto, and opposed two Primeira Liga sides: Boavista and Vitória de Guimarães. Boavista were the defending champions, and they successfully defended their title defeating Vitória de Guimarães 2–1 to claim the Taça de Portugal for a second time.

Match

Details

References

1976
Taca
Boavista F.C. matches
Vitória S.C. matches